Gümüşgün is a village in the Mazgirt District, Tunceli Province, Turkey. The village is populated by Kurds of the Xiran tribe and had a population of 48 in 2021.

The hamlets of Kaman, Kaşıklı and Yongalı are attached to the village.

References 

Villages in Mazgirt District
Kurdish settlements in Tunceli Province